Divya Palat (born in Calcutta, India) is a Producer and Director for theatre plays like A Personal War- Stories of the Mumbai Terror Attacks and was a Hindi actress who has done films, such as Masti with Vivek Oberoi, Dhund with Apurva Agnihotri, Kuch Naa Kaho with Aishwarya and Abhishek Bachchan, Krishna Cottage with Sohail Khan and Dil Bechara Pyaar Ka Mara with actress Mallika Kapoor. She also acted in an Indian television series named Captain Vyom (aired in late 90s).

Life
As her father was periodically transferred, Divya studied in schools in Mumbai, New York and in Delhi. In India, she began her acting career in a TV series, Captain Vyom. Prior to this, she had acted in several plays, including The Sound of Music and Legend of Ram.

In the early 2000s, she set up a Production Company, "Balancing Act Productions", that has produced several plays, including A Personal War- Stories of the Mumbai Terror Attacks, The Verdict, The Graduate, Love Bytes, Starring U & Me! and The Wizard of Oz.

In 2006, she began making short films and teaching short films. She has also branched out into Hindi plays.

She wrote a play based on the survivors of the 26/11 Mumbai Terror Attacks, entitled A Personal War- Stories of the Mumbai Terror Attacks.

Filmography

References

External links
 Divya Palat Official Page
Official site

Indian television actresses
Living people
Actresses from Kolkata
Year of birth missing (living people)
Indian film actresses
Actresses in Hindi television
Actresses in Hindi cinema
20th-century Indian actresses
21st-century Indian actresses